Shasib Kola (also Romanized as Shāsīb Kolā; also known as Shāseb Kolā and Shāyeb Kolā) is a village in Esbu Kola Rural District, in the Central District of Babol County, Mazandaran Province, Iran. At the 2006 census, its population was 127, in 35 families.

References 

Populated places in Babol County